Darial is a town in the Islamabad Capital Territory of Pakistan. It is located at 33° 23' 35N 73° 19' 45E with an altitude of 494 metres (1624 feet).

References 

Union councils of Islamabad Capital Territory